This is a list of notable ramen dishes. Ramen is a Japanese dish that consists of Chinese-style wheat noodles served in a meat or (occasionally) fish-based broth, often flavored with soy sauce or miso. Nearly every region in Japan has its own variation of ramen. Ramen shops (ラーメン屋, ramen-ya) are restaurants that specialize in ramen dishes.

Ramen dishes

 Champon – a ramen dish that is a regional cuisine of Nagasaki, Japan, different versions exist in Japan, Korea and China. Champon is made by frying pork, seafood and vegetables with lard; a soup made with chicken and pig bones is then added. Ramen noodles made especially for champon are added and then boiled. Unlike other ramen dishes, only one pan is needed as the noodles are boiled in the soup. 
 Hakata ramen – first derived from the Hakata region, it has a rich, milky, pork-bone tonkotsu broth and rather thin, non-curly and resilient noodles
 Hokkaido ramen – many cities in Hokkaido have their own versions of ramen, and Sapporo ramen is known throughout Japan. 
 Hiyashi chūka – a Japanese dish consisting of chilled ramen noodles with various toppings served in the summer
 Kagoshima ramen – a ramen dish offered in the Kagoshima Prefecture in southern Japan, it is mainly based on tonkotsu (pork bone broth). It is a little cloudy, and chicken stock, vegetables, dried sardines, kelp and dried mushrooms are added. 
 Muroran curry ramen – a curry flavored ramen noodle dish that is provided at many ramen restaurants in the cities of Muroran, Noboribetsu, Date, and Tōyako in Hokkaido, Japan.
 Sanratanmen – a Japanese hot and sour soup prepared using ramen noodles
 Tonkotsu ramen – a ramen dish that originated on the Kyushu island of Japan, its broth is based upon pork bones.
 Tsukemen – a ramen dish in Japanese cuisine consisting of noodles that are eaten after being dipped in a separate bowl of soup or broth.

See also

 Asian soups
 List of noodle dishes
 List of instant noodle brands
 List of Japanese soups and stews
 Ramen Street

References

External links
 

 
Ramen